Paragoceratidae is an extinct family of ammonoids in the superfamily Dinaritoidea.

References

External links 
 
 

 
Ceratitida families
Early Triassic first appearances
Early Triassic extinctions